Onethindi is a small village in the Northern part of Namibia in the Otjikoto region, 5 km away from Ondangwa.

It was named after the late Nethindi, first headman of Onethindi. The current headman is Brian Ndauka. It has a few shops such as Shoprite, OK, Punyu Model Supermarket and more still under construction. Apart from the shops there's the Punyu Hotel and Casino.

References

Villages in Namibia